Lessagou Habe (Lè-sɔ̀gû:) is a small town and commune in the Cercle of Bankass in the Mopti Region of Mali. In 1998 the commune had a population of 11,646.

The local language is Tomo kan.

References

Communes of Mopti Region